This is a survey of the postage stamps and postal history of Bahawalpur.

First stamps 
Bahawalpur used the postage stamps of British India until 1945. On 1 January 1945, it issued its own stamps, for official use only, a set of pictorials inscribed entirely in Arabic.

Commemorative stamps 
On 1 December 1947 the state issued its first regular stamp, a commemorative stamp for the 200th anniversary of the ruling family, depicting Mohammad Bahawal Khan I, and inscribed "BAHAWALPUR". A series of 14 values appeared 1 April 1948, depicting various Nawabs and buildings. A handful of additional commemoratives ended with an October 1949 issue commemorating the 75th anniversary of the Universal Postal Union. After this the state adopted Pakistani stamps for external mail. Bahawalpur stamps continued to be valid for internal mail until 1953.

See also 
Postage stamps and postal history of Pakistan

References

Further reading 
Dr. Captain U.A.G.Isani & Syed Abid Hussain The Amirate of Bhawalpur: Postal History and Stamps (1932–1949).

External links 

History of the stamps of Bahawalpur.

Princely states of Pakistan
Bahawalpur (princely state)
Philately of Pakistan